Nannophlebia risi, known as the common archtail, is a species of dragonfly in the family Libellulidae.
It is endemic to Australia.

Description
Common archtails are small dragonflies (wingspan 50-60mm, length 35-40mm) having a black abdomen marked with small yellow bands or patches. The abdomen is arched with swollen segments towards the end. The synthorax is black, marked with large yellowish or greenish patches. The wings are hyaline with brown markings on the inner third.

Distribution
The reference field guide shows its distribution extends from the Northern Territory, to Queensland (except for northern Cape York), coastal New South Wales and coastal Victoria.

Habitat
They inhabit streams and rivers, and the larvae are found near gravel or stones.
The taxon has been assessed for the IUCN Red List as least concern.

Gallery

See also
 List of Odonata species of Australia

References

Libellulidae
Odonata of Australia
Insects of Australia
Endemic fauna of Australia
Taxa named by Robert John Tillyard
Insects described in 1913